Dehydroepiandrosterone (DHEA) may refer to:

 5-Dehydroepiandrosterone (5-DHEA; androstenolone, prasterone)
 4-Dehydroepiandrosterone (4-DHEA)
 1-Dehydroepiandrosterone (1-DHEA; 1-androsterone)

See also
 Androstenediol
 Androstenedione
 Androstenolone

Androstanes